Go Back is the first live album by Brazilian rock band Titãs. It was recorded on 8 July 1988 at the Montreux Jazz Festival in Switzerland and released on 14 October of the same year.

The album was seen by the band as the end of a cycle. It generated two singles: "Go Back" and "Marvin".

The show in Montreux 
The band's show was their first on foreign soil. The rehearsals were carried out at a studio in London, where guitarist Tony Bellotto met Jimmy Page and asked him to autograph his Gibson Les Paul with a screwdriver so the letters would never wear off.

The preparation for the concert was marked by difficulties; members claimed they received no help from their label nor from the festival's production team for things like carrying their equipment, moving across Europe, renting studios and rehearse. They soundchecked late and only had 15 minutes to do it. Liminha, hired by the band as a third guitarist, had a problem in his amplifier and wasn't audible for most of the show; he later re-recorded his parts in studio for the album. According to then bassist and vocalist Nando Reis, the album features some additional overdubbing.

About the public, the band stated they were received with a certain strangeness, but the audience (estimated at 2,000 people) grew in quantity and enthusiasm as the concert progressed.

The band's trip to Switzerland generated expectation for a supposed attempt to project the band internationally; members dismissed this idea claiming that in order to try a career outside of Brazil, they would have to make long-term planning.

The setlist involved tracks then lesser known from their first two albums, such as "Marvin" (Titãs) and "Pavimentação" (Televisão), and more famous songs from their two subsequent albums, such as "Polícia" (Cabeça Dinossauro) and "Diversão" (Jesus não Tem Dentes no País dos Banguelas).

Abum production 
From the 15 tracks played in the show, 13 were selected, since the album wouldn't fit them all.

Go Back was mixed at Swanyard studios in London, with the members present and also at the Recording Plant in Los Angeles and at the Nas Nuvens in Rio de Janeiro. Mixing was finished on 12 July 1988. The recording was done digitally in 24 channels.

Following the mixing, they wend to Lisbon for a local tour, opening up for Xutos & Pontapés.

Release and impact
In order to promote the album to the press, a special book with pictures and interviews done by then president of WEA, André Midani, was prepared. The cover and back cover of the album feature pictures of the eight members as children. On the front cover, starting left and going clockwise, Reis, keyboardist and vocalist Sérgio Britto, then vocalist and saxophonist Paulo Miklos and Bellotto can be seen. On the back cover, following the same directions, guitarist Marcelo Fromer, vocalists Branco Mello and Arnaldo Antunes and drummer Charles Gavin can be seen. The booklet has then recent pictures of the members touringaround Europe.

Despite the album having come out after the promulgation of the current Constitution of Brazil, which abolished censorship, copies were still pressed with a sticker warning against radio airplay of "Bichos Escrotos".

Between October and November 1988, they did a promotional tour and planned to go to Los Angeles to record their then next album. According to the Dicionário Cravo Albin da Música Popular Brasileira, the album has sold 320,000 copies.

Critical reception 

Writing on allmusic, Eduardo Rivadavia called their performance "triumphant" but said the album, although sampling "the band's many talents" was "still something of a grab bag that is bound to omit certain personal favorites for every fan".

Arthur Dapieve, from Jornal do Brasil, congratulated the "courage" of the band to face an unknown audience and the new arrangements. He concluded his review by saying, in allusion to the lyrics of "Não Vou Me Adaptar", that "Titãs have always spoken what no one's said; they have always listened to what no one's heard; and will never adapt themselves — to the mediocrity of the cowards".

Track listing

Personnel 
 Branco Mello – vocals
 Paulo Miklos – Vocals and Saxophone
 Marcelo Fromer – Rhythm Guitar
 Tony Bellotto – Lead Guitar
 Arnaldo Antunes – Vocals
 Sérgio Britto – Keyboards and vocals
 Nando Reis – Vocals and bass
 Charles Gavin – drums and percussion
 Liminha – Third Guitar

References

Titãs live albums
Albums produced by Liminha
1988 live albums
Warner Music Group live albums
Albums recorded at the Montreux Jazz Festival